Patrick Fernandez  (born 4 March 1952) is a French former Grand Prix motorcycle road racer. His best year was in 1979 when he rode a Yamaha to finish second to Kork Ballington in the 350cc world championship. Fernandez won three Grand Prix races during his career.

References 

1952 births
Living people
French motorcycle racers
125cc World Championship riders
250cc World Championship riders
350cc World Championship riders
500cc World Championship riders
French people of Spanish descent